"All Things Go" is a song by Trinidadian-American rapper and singer Nicki Minaj from her third studio album, The Pinkprint (2014). It was released on December 3, 2014, by Young Money, Cash Money, and Republic Records as the first promotional single and opening track from the album. The song has since peaked at number 38 on the US Billboard Hot R&B/Hip-Hop Songs chart.

Composition
For Time contributor Eliza Berman, "All Things Go" features lyrics that discuss a wide range of personal challenges Minaj has faced, ranging from strained relationships with her family to the murder of her cousin Nicholas Telemaque in 2011. The song opens with Minaj reflecting on fame and the speed in which her life has moved; "Life is a movie, there'll never be a sequel."

In the following verse Minaj sings about her cousin's death and how she could have helped him if she had let him stay with her saying; "I'll pop a pill and remember the look in his eyes the last day he saw me."
The final verse sees Minaj address motherhood, ranging from her relationship with her mother and her brother, to a reference to abortion.

Critical reception
Niki McGloster from Billboard commented that the track was "the most razor-sharp emotionally and most cathartic album cut, it's a great indicator of her newfound musical maturity".

Live performances
On December 6, 2014, Minaj first performed the song on Saturday Night Live.

The song was included on the setlist of The Pinkprint Tour which commenced on March 16, 2015 and ended on August 23, 2015. 

At the 2022 MTV Video Music Awards, Minaj performed the song as part of her Michael Jackson Video Vanguard Award Medley.

References

2014 songs
Nicki Minaj songs
Songs written by Allen Ritter
Songs written by Boi-1da
Songs written by Ester Dean
Songs written by Nicki Minaj
Song recordings produced by Boi-1da
Song recordings produced by Vinylz
Songs about fame
Songs about crime
Songs about death
Songs about violence
Songs about abortion
Songs about families
Songs about mothers
Songs based on actual events
Song recordings produced by Allen Ritter
Songs written by Vinylz